Microphysula cookei, common name the Vancouver snail, is a species of air-breathing land snail, a terrestrial pulmonate gastropod mollusk in the family Thysanophoridae.

Original description 
The species Microphysula cookei was originally described as Zonitoides cookei by Henry Augustus Pilsbry in 1922.

Pilsbry's original text (the type description) reads as follows:

References 

Thysanophoridae
Taxa named by Henry Augustus Pilsbry
Gastropods described in 1922